Mimeomyces is a genus of fungi in the family Laboulbeniaceae. The genus contain 16 species.

References

External links
Mimeomyces at Index Fungorum

Laboulbeniomycetes